The Pistol Mitralieră model 1963/1965 (abbreviated PM md. 63 or simply md. 63) is a Romanian 7.62x39mm assault rifle. Developed in the late 1950s, the PM md. 63 was a derivative of the Soviet AKM produced under license. It was the standard issue infantry weapon of the Army of the Socialist Republic of Romania until the late 1980s, after which it was gradually superseded by the Pușcă Automată model 1986, a derivative of the Soviet AK-74.

Beginning in 1965, Romania also produced the Pistol Mitralieră model 1965 (abbreviated PM md. 65 or simply md. 65), which is an md. 63 with a folding stock.

History
During the late 1950s, the standard service rifle of the Romanian Army was the Soviet AK-47, as well as a variant of the same weapon with a folding stock, the AKS. Around the same period, however, the Soviet Union developed the AKM, an improved AK-47 design which utilized a stamped metal receiver and was cheaper to produce.  With Soviet assistance, the Romanian government launched a program to manufacture a domestic AK rifle patterned directly after the AKM. The new weapon was to replace the AK-47 in Romanian service and was designated Pistol Mitralieră. The first production model appeared in 1963 and was designated Pistol Mitralieră model 1963 (PM md. 63). PM md. 63s produced for export were designated AIM md. 63. A semi-automatic variant of the PM md. 63 was produced solely for issue to the Patriotic Guards, a state militia; these were marked with a large "G" on either side of the trunnion. The PM md. 63 was initially indistinguishable from the Soviet AKM; however, during the mid 1960s a laminated wooden foregrip was added to the design. This was to allow Romanian riflemen to control the weapon's vertical muzzle climb during fully automatic fire. For the duration of its service life, the PM md. 63 and its derivatives were produced at the Cugir Arms Factory in Alba County.

In 1965, a second production model appeared and was designated Pistol Mitralieră model 1965 (PM md. 65). This was to replace the AKS in Romanian service and featured a folding stock; it resembled a modified AKMS with an older AKS-pattern stock. PM md. 65s produced for export were designated AIMS md. 65. The PM md. 65 was initially produced with traditional AKM pattern handguards due to the difficulty encountered in adding the PM md. 63's foregrip to the folding stock design; the stock was designed to fold flat against the base of the handguard. Adding a foregrip which pointed drastically rearwards was problematic because this would impede changing the magazine. Romanian engineers subsequently designed a shorter foregrip for the PM md. 65 with a slight rearward cant, allowing the folding stock to lock undearneath the handguard while also allowing enough space for a magazine to be removed or inserted.

The PM md. 65 initially required a separate production line from that of the PM md. 63, since the addition of a folding stock to the design necessitated a different receiver. In an attempt to streamline production, the Cugir Arms Factory subsequently replaced the traditional AKS under-folding stock with a side-folding stock copied directly from the East German MpiKMS, which was itself a licensed derivative of the AKMS. The side-folding MpiKMS stock could be fitted on AKM-pattern receivers designed for fixed stocks, making the receivers interchangeable. This modified PM md. 65 received the designation PM md. 90. The PM md. 90 was assembled with the same foregrip and handguards as the PM md. 63, since the side-folding stock meant that a different foregrip was no longer necessary.

During the 1980s, the United States Army acquired a number of AIM md. 63s from an unidentified nation which had received Romanian military aid; these were used to simulate AKMs by its opposing force (OPFOR) units during training exercises. The AIM md. 63s were also used by the United States Marine Corps for weapons familiarization courses. The Provisional Irish Republican Army (IRA) used AIM md. 63s during the Troubles; these were apparently received as military aid from Libya. Following the official cessation of hostilities in Northern Ireland, the rifles continued to be used by republican dissidents in attacks such as the Massereene Barracks shooting.

Vast numbers of surplus or redundant PM md. 63/65s were disposed of from Romanian military stocks following the Romanian Revolution and sold overseas, making the weapon type increasingly prolific around the world.

Features

The PM md. 63 was almost indistinguishable from an early Soviet AKM with a stamped receiver. It was issued with an early pattern AKM bayonet, also manufactured under license from the Soviet Union. The Romanian PM md. 63 bayonets were indistinguishable from early Soviet AKM bayonets, bar the unique serial numbers with a Latin letter prefix etched on the crossguard and scabbard face. They were also fitted with wrist straps of brown leather with three-slot buckles for attachment to the crossguard and a friction buckle for attachment to the hilt. The bayonet was suspended by a bayonet frog, rather than the more common hangar strap favored by some Eastern European armies of the era, from a rifleman's equipment. The PM md. 63 was also issued with a unique Romanian leather sling, which was later replaced by nylon slings that more closely resembled the late Soviet pattern.

Early production PM md. 63/65s were not fitted with the same slanted muzzle brake as the Soviet AKM, but a simple muzzle nut which more closely resembled that of the original AK-47. Later PM md. 63s and PM md. 90s were fitted with the slanted muzzle brake.

Each PM md. 63/65's receiver was marked on the left with the year of production and a serial number with a Latin letter prefix. There are three fire selector markings on the right side of the receiver: "S" ("Sigur", safety), "FA" ("Foc Automat", automatic fire), and "FF" ("Foc cu Foc", semi-automatic fire). The same fire selector markings on the AIM and AIMS export variants were "S", "A", and "R".

Variants

Patriotic Guards version 

The most-produced civilian export variation of this rifle is that of the 'Gardă' designation, produced for the Romanian Patriotic Guards. These rifles have a letter 'G' engraved on the left side of the rear sight block. The civil guard versions are modified by the removal of the sear and the modification of the disconnector to be semi-automatic only. Tens of thousands of these have been imported into the United States and sold as 'parts kits' (the receiver is destroyed by torch-cutting per BATF regulations – without the receiver, the kit is no longer legally considered a firearm). They are colloquially known among firearms enthusiasts as "Romy G's".

PM md. 80 
The Pistol Mitralieră model 1980 is a short barreled AK variant, and the first side-folding stock version produced in Romania. It featured a shorter gas block and usually used 20 round magazines. The front sight post is combined with the gas-block to provide an overall short length. The side folder is straight and folds to the left. There are two types of muzzle brakes used: a cylindrical one, and more commonly a slightly conical one. It is also known as the AIMR.

PM md. 90 

The Pistol Mitralieră model 1990 also known as the PM md 90 is the 7.62mm response to the 5.45mm Pușcă Automată model 1986. It is internally identical to a PM md. 63/65, and outwardly differs in that it has a wire folding stock identical to the PA md. 86 stock, and that all of the rifles are fitted with slant brakes. It was extensively used in the Romanian Revolution along with the md. 63 and md. 65

Short barrel version 

The carbine version of the model 90, called simply PM md. 90 cu țeavă scurtă (short barreled PM md. 90), has a 12-inch [305 mm] barrel, an overall length of 31.69 inches [805 mm] (or 23.81 inches [605 mm] with the stock folded), and weighs 6.83 lbs. (3.1 kg) empty. It was designed for tank crews and special forces. Apart from the stock and the shortened barrel, it features the same modifications as the PM md. 80.

7.62mm RPK 
The RPK version of the md. 63 is called the md. 64. It is essentially identical to the Soviet RPK.

Other civilian versions
Several semi-automatic variants of the PM md. 63 have been produced for commercial export to the United States, namely the WASR-series rifles imported by Century Arms. Other semi-automatic PM md. 63 derivatives sold commercially in the United States were designated SAR-1, ROMAK 1, ROMAK 991, and WUM-1. A variant of the PM md. 90 carbine is also available in the United States as the Draco.

In Germany there are civilian versions on the market under the name / model Cugir WS1-63 (fixed wood stock), WS1-64 (underfolder stock), WS1-64SB (Short Barrel 314mm with the underfolder stock).

The WS1-63HO is the straight pull non semi auto version. The gun must be charged after every shot that is fired.

Operators

Current operators
 
 
 
 
 
 
 
  Lord's Resistance Army
 
 
 : Used by Navy personnel, border guards, tank crews, reserve troops.
 
 
 
 
  100 AIMs used by US Army OPFOR in the 1980s.

Former operators
 : 1,000 donated by Romania between 2002 and 2006.
  Provisional Irish Republican Army
  RENAMO

Gallery

See also
 Pușcă Automată model 1986
 WASR-series rifles
 List of assault rifles

References

External links 
 Kalashnikov guns website (confuses the md. 63 designation for the md. 65)

Rifles of the Cold War
Infantry weapons of the Cold War
Assault rifles of Romania
Kalashnikov derivatives
Romania–Soviet Union relations
7.62×39mm assault rifles
Weapons and ammunition introduced in 1963